Cataula  is an unincorporated community and census-designated place (CDP) in Harris County, Georgia, United States.

It was first listed as a CDP in the 2020 census with a population of 1,433.

History 
"Cataula" is derived from the Muscogee word kitali, meaning "withered mulberry;" Cataula is located on Cataula Creek, which flows into nearby Mulberry Creek.

Geography 
Cataula is located at 32°45'52.81" North, 84°54'4.68" West (32.640602, -84.9013). It is located along U.S. Route 27, which runs north to south through the city, leading southwest  to Columbus and north  to LaGrange. Georgia State Route 315 meets U.S. Route 27 in the city limits for a very short concurrency.

Demographics

2020 census

Note: the US Census treats Hispanic/Latino as an ethnic category. This table excludes Latinos from the racial categories and assigns them to a separate category. Hispanics/Latinos can be of any race.

Education 
The community is home to two of the seven schools in the county:
Mulberry Creek Elementary School
Creekside Intermediate School (grades 5–6)

References

External links 
 Kingsboro & Cataula historical marker

Unincorporated communities in Harris County, Georgia
Unincorporated communities in Georgia (U.S. state)
Census-designated places in Harris County, Georgia
Columbus metropolitan area, Georgia